Zhou Wenfeng (born 22 January 2001) is a Chinese footballer currently playing as a midfielder for Beijing Guoan.

Club career
Zhou Wenfeng was promoted to the senior team of Beijing Guoan within the 2020 Chinese Super League season. He would make his debut in a Chinese FA Cup game on 12 December 2020 against Wuhan Zall in a 3-0 defeat. He would be given an opportunity to participate within senior games when he was part of the AFC Champions League squad, which was a mix of reserves and youth players to participate within centralized venues while the clubs senior players were still dealing with self-isolating measures due to COVID-19. He would make his continental debut in a AFC Champions League game on 8 July 2021 against Daegu FC in a 3-0 defeat.

Career statistics
.

References

External links

2001 births
Living people
Chinese footballers
Association football midfielders
Beijing Guoan F.C. players